Camille Prigent (born 18 December 1997) is a French slalom canoeist who has competed at the international level since 2013.

She won a gold medal in the K1 team event at the 2018 ICF Canoe Slalom World Championships in Rio de Janeiro. She also won five medals at the European Championships (2 golds, 2 silvers and 1 bronze).

Her father Jean-Yves is a former slalom canoeist and medalist from World Championships. Her older brother Yves is also a slalom canoeist and a medalist from World Championships.

Results

World Cup individual podiums

Complete World Cup results

Notes
No overall rankings were determined by the ICF, with only two races possible due to the COVID-19 pandemic.

References

External links

 
 
 
 

Living people
French female canoeists
1997 births
Medalists at the ICF Canoe Slalom World Championships
Canoeists at the 2014 Summer Youth Olympics
Sportspeople from Rennes
Youth Olympic gold medalists for France
21st-century French women